Mary Stewart (Cotton), (born 25 February 1956 in Birmingham) is a female retired  middle distance runner who represented Great Britain, England and Scotland.

Athletics career
A member of the Birchfield Harriers, she competed in the 1500 metres at the 1976 Summer Olympics in Montreal, finishing in fourth place in her semi-final race and just failing to qualify for the final. She won the gold medal in the 1500 metres at the 1977 European Indoor Championship in San Sebastián. She represented England and won a gold medal in the 1,500 metres event, at the 1978 Commonwealth Games in Edmonton, Alberta, Canada.

Personal life
She is the younger sister of the Scottish athlete Ian Stewart, the family having moved from Musselburgh to Birmingham, England in 1948.

References

Living people
1956 births
Sportspeople from Birmingham, West Midlands
Commonwealth Games gold medallists for England
Athletes (track and field) at the 1976 Summer Olympics
Olympic athletes of Great Britain
English female middle-distance runners
Commonwealth Games medallists in athletics
Athletes (track and field) at the 1974 British Commonwealth Games
Athletes (track and field) at the 1978 Commonwealth Games
Medallists at the 1978 Commonwealth Games